The 2006–07 Liga Alef season saw Hapoel Bnei Jadeidi (champions of the North Division) and Hapoel Maxim Lod (champions of the South Division) winning the title and promotion to Liga Artzit. However as Hapoel Maxim Lod folded during the following summer, eventually second placed Hapoel Kfar Shalem was promoted instead.

At the bottom, the bottom two clubs in each division, Hapoel Reineh, Maccabi Sektzia Ma'alot-Tarshiha (from North division), A.S. Ramat Eliyahu and Hapoel Arad (from South division) were all automatically relegated to Liga Bet, whilst the two clubs which were ranked in 12th place in each division, Hapoel Kafr Sumei and Hapoel Tzafririm Holon entered a promotion/relegation play-offs, Hapoel Tzafririm Holon prevailing to stay in Liga Alef, while Hapoel Kafr Sumei were relegated after losing the play-offs.

North Division

South Division

Relegation play-offs

North play-off
The 12th placed club in Liga Alef North, Hapoel Kafr Sumei, faced the Liga Bet North A and Liga Bet North B runners-up, Ahva Arraba and Ironi Tiberias. The teams played each other in a round-robin tournament, with all matches played at a neutral venue, Green Stadium.

Ironi Tiberias won the play-offs and was promoted to Liga Alef.

South play-off
The 12th placed club in Liga Alef South, Hapoel Tzafririm Holon, faced the Liga Bet South A and Liga Bet South B runners-up, Beitar Kfar Saba and Hapoel Masos/Segev Shalom. The teams played each other in a round-robin tournament, with all matches held at a neutral venue, Bat Yam Municipal Stadium.

Hapoel Tzafririm Holon won the play-offs to retain its place in Liga Alef. Since Hapoel Maxim Lod folded during the summer break, Beitar Kfar Saba was promoted as well, as they had better winning percentage of the two Liga Bet south divisions runners-up.

References
 The Israel Football Association 
 The Israel Football Association 
Play-off Liga Alef/Liga Bet One 

Liga Alef seasons
4
Israel